Agis Stinas (1900-1987), his real name was Spyros Priftis, was an executive of the Communist Party of Greece and then executive of various small Trotskyist parties. During axis occupation of Greece he promoted Revolutionary defeatism. He was political mentor of Cornelius Castoriadis.

First years
He was born in a village in Corfu. In 1918 he became a member of  Sosialistikó Ergatikó Kómma Elládas. He took part in Greco-Turkish War (1919–1922) and he was an active member of the party. As a prominent member of the party he was sentenced to death, but he just jailed. During 1926 election he was a parliamentary candidate in Corfu region. During 1931 he was expelled from KKE.

Trotskyism
He became a member of Archeio-Marxism party. During the 1935 Greek coup d'état attempt, he was a critical supporter of Democratic army officials. In 1936 he promoted the need for general strike. Afterwards he was arrested from 4th of August Regime and jailed in Acronauplia. There, in 1937 he formed the opinion of not supporting the USSR in the next world war.

Occupation of Greece from Axis forces and civil war (1946-1949)
With the assistance of the far right Metropolitan bishop Pantaleon, he managed to escape. He founded various parties with his comrades Yannis Tamtakos and Cornelius Castoriadis, that had thesis against the communist-led National Liberation Front (Greece) and promoted Revolutionary defeatism. In 1946 he tried to stop his party of having political affairs with Communist Party, and accused Communist Party as a bridgehead of the Soviet Union. After the civil war he had the same opinion against United Democratic Left.
In 1948 the fraction of Stinas was represented by Cornelius Castoriadis in Second World Congress of Fourth International.
In his memoirs Stinas wrote that he was a member of 4th International until 1947.

References

External links
Selected texts and highlights from Agis Stinas’ book: Memoirs – Sixty Years under the Flag of Socialist Revolution (translated in english)

1900 births
1987 deaths
Greek communists
Greek Trotskyists
Politicians from Corfu